Ralph David Carter (born May 30, 1961) is an American actor and singer best remembered as Michael Evans, the youngest child of Florida and James Evans Sr., on the CBS sitcom Good Times from 1974–1979. Before joining Good Times, Carter appeared in the Broadway musical Raisin, based on the Lorraine Hansberry drama A Raisin in the Sun, as was noted in the credits during the first season.

Early acting career
Carter started on Broadway at just nine years old in the musical The Me Nobody Knows. After runs in Tough To Get Help, Dude and Via Galactica, he landed his breakout role as Travis Younger in Raisin. For which, he won the 1973 Drama Desk Award for Most Promising Performer as well as the 1974 Theatre World Award and a nomination for the 1974 Tony Award for Best Featured Actor in a Musical.

Good Times
Norman Lear was enjoying huge success in the 1970s, with the hit televisions series All in the Family, Sanford and Son, and Maude. Lear developed Good Times as a spin-off series for Maude's housekeeper, Florida Evans (portrayed by Esther Rolle) and her husband Henry, (John Amos), who was renamed James. Because of Carter's success in Raisin, Lear bought out the remainder of his Broadway contract to cast him as the first original character of Good Times, James and Florida's youngest son, Michael.

Other work 
In 1975, Carter recorded an album called Young and in Love and performed the song "When You're Young and in Love" on Soul Train. That song, along with "Extra, Extra (Read All About It)", charted at No. 10 and No. 12 respectively. In 1985, he released a single called "Get it Right".

In 2005, Carter appeared in the cast of "Ain't Supposed to Die a Natural Death" for the Classical Theatre of Harlem Company.

References

External links

1961 births
African-American male actors
American male child actors
American male musical theatre actors
American male television actors
Living people
Singers from New York City
African-American male child actors
20th-century African-American male singers
21st-century African-American people